The 1948–49 season was Chelsea Football Club's thirty-fifth competitive season. Chelsea finished 13th in the First Division and reached the fifth round of the FA Cup. The season also saw the arrival of Roy Bentley, who would become, at the time, the club's leading goalscorer.

Table

References

External links
 1948–49 season at stamford-bridge.com

1948–49
English football clubs 1948–49 season